Brewster is a village and the principal settlement within the town of Southeast in Putnam County, New York. Brewster’s population was 2,508 at the time of the 2020 census. The village, which is the most densely populated portion of the county, was named for two early farmer landowners, Walter and James Brewster, who donated land for the Brewster railroad station in 1848.

History 
The village of Brewster derives its name from that of the landowner, Walter Brewster, who invited the New York and Harlem Railroad to build a depot on his property in 1848. Brewster's Station, New York (sometimes just "Brewster's"), appeared on maps, on postcards, and in directories of Putnam County throughout the second half of the 19th century. It was officially incorporated as the Village of Brewster, New York, in 1894.

In 1886, historian William Smith Pelletreau published The History of Putnam County, New York. In his second chapter on the town of Southeast, he wrote: "The land now [1886] embraced within the limits of the village of Brewster consists of a farm which was sold by the commissioners of forfeiture to Peleg Bailey, in 1781. A portion of it afterward passed into the possession of Bailey Howes, his grandson, who sold 98 acres to Gilbert Bailey on April 1, 1833. Two other tracts containing 39 acres were sold to Gilbert Bailey, by William P. Downs and Frederick Parks in 1838. On the 17th of February, 1848, Gilbert Bailey sold the whole tracts, estimated at 134 acres, to James and Walter F. Brewster, for the sum of $8,000."
 
"At the time of the purchase, the New York and Harlem Railroad was finished and trains were running as far as Croton Falls. The road was surveyed as far as Pawling, and the prospect of its being continued to that point seemed certain, and to the new purchasers of the farm it seemed just the place for a station."

"The New York and Harlem Railroad was finished to this place and the depot was built in that year, and what is now [1886] the Main street was opened, for the purpose of allowing the stages from Danbury to come to the station. Previous to this the firm of Crosby and DeForest had run a line of four horse stages to Croton Falls, from Danbury. The first new house in the place was built by Walter F. Brewster, in 1850 and stood in front of the present [1886] Methodist church." That house, now listed as the Walter Brewster House on the New York State and national historic registers, is owned by the Landmark Preservation Society of Southeast.

"The Harlem Railroad's extension of its mileage in 1849 proved advantageous to Mr. Brewster, who needed all sorts of materials in his building activities. Large shipments were billed simply to 'Brewster's Station' for lack of better designation. This is the apparent origin of the village's name, which many years ago was shortened to Brewster."

Post offices 
Jonathan F. Frost was the first Postmaster of the Brewster's Station post office, which operated from October 25, 1850 through April 28, 1883.

During this period in American history, post offices were frequently located in the stores or businesses owned by the individuals who served as postmasters. This held true in the village of Brewster for the next century.

In 1863, the Brewster Station post office relocated to the A.F. Lobdell General Store, across from the railroad station, the present location of the Avery Building at 12-18 Main Street. Alexander F. Lobdell, the store's proprietor, was appointed postmaster by President Abraham Lincoln and was reappointed by Presidents Grant, Hayes, Garfield and Arthur, continuing as Brewster's postmaster until 1887. The Brewster post office began operation on April 28, 1883, removing the word "Station" in its identity and postmarks.

In 1887, the post office relocated to the Brewster Standard building, the present location of the Sprague Building at 31 Main Street. In 1886, Emerson W. Addis, publisher of the Brewster Standard weekly newspaper, became the postmaster and held that position until 1916.

In 1916, the post office moved to new quarters on Park Street, between Main Street and Marvin Avenue, into the Rundall Building, and John Thorp became the new postmaster.

In 1923, Ralph Diehl, proprietor of the Brewster Bakery, became postmaster, and the post office was moved to his baking plant on Progress Street in 1927. Howard Tuttle later became the postmaster, holding the position until 1934 when Seth Howes was appointed. In 1936, the post office relocated to the building now occupied by the Eagle Eye Thrift Shop at 65 Main Street.

Mr. Howes held the office until 1958 when John F. Larkin Jr. was made acting postmaster. He was later promoted to the full title of postmaster.

On July 17, 1966, the post office relocated to a new brick building on Main Street, where it remained for the next three decades. Mr. Larkin retired in 1972 and was succeeded by Earl Tuttle, who became the last Southeast resident to hold the position of postmaster since that time. Mr. Tuttle retired in 1985.

The new facility was the first Brewster post office to occupy a space that was specifically designed for the purpose, rather than being retrofitted from some previous use. It had a separate lobby to house post office boxes, a loading dock at the rear of the building and a postal inspector's separate entrance and hallway with one-way glass for observing postal workers and the public.

In the mid-1990s, the Main Street facility closed and a new post office opened at its present location at 3 Mount Ebo Road North outside the village limits in the town of Southeast.

"Brewster" vs. "Southeast" 

The town of Southeast contains the village of Brewster.  In New York, villages are always within one or more towns, and village juridiction may override that of similar town laws. Residents of the town often refer to the entire municipality as "Brewster," as that is the postal designation.

The railroad station in downtown Brewster, owned in turn by the New York Central, Penn Central, Conrail, and now Metro-North Railroad, has always been known as "Brewster" because it is located in the village of Brewster. Since 1849, rail customers coming to Southeast only knew they were travelling to "Brewster". Over time, the name Southeast was all but forgotten.

The new depot that was built in Southeast, just a quarter mile north of the village, was first named "Brewster North". That second depot has since been renamed "Southeast".

Before 1962, there were several local post offices throughout the town of Southeast, located near larger concentrations of residences and businesses. The last of these, Southeast's Putnam Lake post office, closed in 1968. When a new post office opened at 16 Main Street in Brewster on July 17, 1966, even before Interstate 84 and Interstate 684 were constructed, it was named Brewster and given the zip code 10509.  The two highways brought massive population increases, nearly tripling the number of residents in Southeast in a matter of about 20 years. As a result, "Brewster, NY 10509" was part of the return address of every resident of Southeast and Brewster. Probably because of the proximity to the Brewster train station, the highway exit signs of I-84 and I-684 say "Brewster". Road signs in White Plains, Danbury, Carmel and other nearby towns all direct travelers to Brewster. Only the town's "Welcome to Southeast" signs acknowledge the town's existence.

The post office has relocated out of the village and removed "Brewster" from the building. The zip code is still 10509 but does not have the name of the municipality on its exterior of the building. Residents who live in the town still use "Brewster 10509" for their return address, and the post office still uses "Brewster" rather than "Southeast" in its postmarks.

Geography

Brewster is located along the East Branch of the Croton River at  (41.396050, −73.615954), near the center of the town of Southeast.

U.S. Route 6 runs through the village as its Main Street. U.S. Route 202 and New York State Route 22 run concurrently along the southern boundary of the village, and Interstate 84 passes just east of the village, intersecting Interstate 684. The Brewster train station is on the Harlem Line.

Demographics

As of the census of 2020, there were 2,508 people residing in Brewster. There were 701 housing units at an average density of 1,851.6 per square mile (708.7/km2). The racial makeup of the village was 55.98% Hispanic or Latino, 36.61% non-Hispanic white, 2.59% African American, .42% Native American, 3.22% Asian, .04% from other races, and 1.13% from two or more races.

At the 2010 census, the village had the highest concentration of Guatemalans in the US, comprising 38.16% of the village population.

The households, out of which 26.5% had children under the age of 18 living with them, 33.9% were married couples living together, 11.9% had a female householder with no husband present, and 47.4% were non-families. 34.2% of all households were made up of individuals, and 10.0% had someone living alone who was 65 years of age or older. The average household size was 2.52 and the average family size was 3.08.

In the village, the population was spread out, with 20.4% under the age of 18, 11.9% from 18 to 24, 41.4% from 25 to 44, 16.3% from 45 to 64, and 10.0% who were 65 years of age or older. The median age was 33 years. For every 100 females there were 131.0 males. For every 100 females age 18 and over, there were 128.4 males.

The median income for a household in the village was $42,750, and the median income for a family was $48,393. Males had a median income of $28,793 versus $28,929 for females. The per capita income for the village was $21,865. About 9.0% of families and 14.5% of the population were below the poverty line, including 12.4% of those under age 18 and 12.1% of those age 65 or over.

Schools
 Brewster Central School District
 Brewster High School
 Henry H. Wells Middle School
 C. V. Starr Intermediate School
 John F. Kennedy Elementary School
 Private schools
 Longview School
 Saint Lawrence O'Toole

Government 

Governor Kathy Hochul since 2021 
US Senator Charles Schumer since 1999  
US Senator Kirsten Gillibrand since 2009    
US Congressman Sean Patrick Maloney since 2013  
NY State Senator Terrence Murphy since 2015 
NY State Assemblyman Kevin Byrne since 2017
Putnam County Executive Kevin Byrne since 2022
Putnam County Legislator Paul E. Jonke (District 6) since 2017
Putnam County Legislator Joseph F. Castellano (District 7) since 2013
Mayor James Schoenig Since 2007
Village Trustees: Christine Piccini, George Gaspar, Tom Boissonnault, Mary Bryde

Notable people
 Fanny Crosby (1820–1915), hymnodist, blind activist and minister
 Max Dreyfus (1874-1964), music publisher and songwriter
 Charles F. Murphy (1875-1934), politician, lawyer and former NY State Senator
 Edith Diehl (1876-1953), bookbinder and author
 Chester Beach (1881-1956), sculptor
 Rex Stout (1886-1975), writer
 Billy Jones (1889-1940), singer
 Marian Anderson (1897-1993), contralto singer
 Evelyn Irons (1900-2000), journalist
 Pola Stout (1902-1984), designer
 Diana Vreeland (1903-1989), fashion editor
 Glenda Farrell (1904-1971), actress
 Dorothy Fields (1905-1974), lyricist and librettist
 John Bernard Myers (1920-1987), art dealer and writer
 Willis H. Stephens (born 1925), politician
 Donald Symington (1925-2013), actor
 Norman Laliberté (1925-2021), artist
 Chris Palmer (born 1949), football coach
 Laura Branigan (1952–2004), singer, songwriter, and actress
 Willis Stephens (born 1955), politician 
 Ava Fabian (born 1962), model and actress
 Joe Rubbo (born 1963), actor and tv producer
 Michael Imperioli (born 1966), actor, screenwriter, tv producer and musician
 Mclain Ward (born 1975), equestrian
 Shayna Levy (born 1997), soccer player

References

External links

 Village website
 Brewster Central School District
 Brewster Chamber of Commerce
 Brewster Education Foundation
 Brewster Fire Department
 Brewster Public Library
 Southeast Museum

Villages in Putnam County, New York